The Crimean Tatar Wikipedia is the Crimean Tatar language edition of the free online encyclopedia Wikipedia. The articles were originally written in Wikimedia Incubator, and the Crimean Tatar Wikipedia was created on January 12, 2008.

Statistics 

The main problem of the project is a lack of volunteers. The vast majority of edits are made by several volunteers, none of whom is a native speaker.

Milestones 
 January 12, 2008 — 1st article
 January 21, 2008 — 557 articles
 October 20, 2009 — 1,000 articles
 January 30, 2010 — 1,405 articles
 May 16, 2014 — 4,035 articles
 June 2021 — 10,000 articles

References

Links 

 List of Wikipedias and their ranking by number of articles
 Wikipedia Statistics Crimean Tatar
 Wikimedia Traffic Analysis Report - Wikipedia Page Views Per Country
 Crimean Tatar Wikipedia 
 Crimean Tatar Wikipedia mobile version 

Wikipedias by language
Internet properties established in 2008
Ukrainian online encyclopedias
Crimean Tatar culture